The UAE Youth League is a youth league system that are organised by either the UAE Pro League Committee or UAE FA. The system was introduced in 2012 with its first season being held in 2012/13, the intention was to develop professional football at a youth level in the country. While originally only organising an under-21 competition, in the following year, the UAE FA created an under 19 league to expand its youth development.

U21 League

List of Champions

Performances by clubs

U19 League

List of Champions

Performances by clubs

References

External links

Youth League
2012 establishments in the United Arab Emirates